People with disabilities in Pakistan are seen differently than in most Western countries due to cultural and religious beliefs. The lack of accurate epidemiological evidence on disabilities, insufficient resources, weak health care facilities and worker shortages are major obstacles to meeting the needs of disabled Pakistanis.

Demographics
The 5th Population and Housing Census conducted in 1998 identified the population of Persons with Disabilities in Pakistan to be 2.38% of the entire population. However, as per the 6th Population and Housing Census of 2017, the percentage has gone down to less than 0.48%. The drastic decline in the population percentage has raised concerns in some circles, Supreme Court of Pakistan being amongst them: "the court expressed its displeasure that Pakistan Bureau of Statistics continued citing various issues for not counting disabled persons after the census had already begun across the country." If it were not for the Supreme Court of Pakistan's intervention, the disability question would not even be made part of the survey at a later stage. The Bureau itself accepted that census might not be thorough, an official stated: "that there was a possibility that the number of transgender and disabled persons had not been shown in complete detail."

Some stakeholders also follow the figure of 15% identified by World Health Organization. As per WHO, "About 15% of the world's population lives with some form of disability." Using this figure, British Council estimated the population of Persons with Disabilities to be around 27 million in their 2017 report. Moreover, in 2011 Pakistan Poverty Alleviation Fund undertook a comprehensive survey of 23 union councils in seven districts of Pakistan, comprising 78939 households, and found the disability prevalence rate to be around 12 percent, of which 2 percent had severe disabilities.

Major Issues

Driving Licensing for the Deaf

Acquiring driving Licenses has long been an important issue for the Deaf Community. As per the official community released by the Deaf and Mute Community during a protest: “We have been holding demonstrations for the last 10 years, government is unwilling to accept our demands. Driving licenses should be issued to the deaf.” 

Promises have been made by the authorities several times to issue driving licenses to the Deaf but it has never materialized.

The government of Sindh recently announced that driving licences will be issued to people with hearing disabilities, as the provincial cabinet has approved the issuance of it.

Inaccessibility

As per a report published by British Council, 72% of Persons with Disabilities reported inaccessibility as a major barrier to access education, training & employment. Not only this, Persons with Disabilities also faced issues during General Elections and could not exercise their right to vote because of inaccessible polling station.

Education
There are 531 special schools in Pakistan and about 200 non-governmental organizations and disabled people's organizations offering education to people with disabilities.

Employment
As per British Council’s report Moving from the margins: Mainstreaming persons with disabilities in Pakistan (2014), PWDs tend to have poorer health outcomes, lower education achievements, higher rates of poverty, and less economic participation. These conditions ultimately exclude PWDs as productive members of society; some estimates suggest the cost of exclusion leads to annual loss of US$11.9bn-15.4bn, or 4.9-6.3% of Pakistan’s GDP. Employment quotas have been in place for Persons with Disabilities since 1981 when a figure was 2% was set up by the government. Currently, the employment quotas are as follows: Sindh 5%, Punjab 3%, KPK 3% and Balochistan 5%. The government of Sindh’s Department of Empowerment of Persons with Disabilities hosted a session with the assistance of a local NGO NOWPDP where the current head of the Department Syed Qassim Naveed Qamar highlighted the steps the government was taking to employ persons with disabilities. The government, he said, "was rigorously working for accessibility and transport and also accommodating persons with intellectual disabilities along with other disabilities."

Policy
Pakistan is a party to the United Nations Convention on the Rights of Persons with Disabilities, having signed the treaty on 25 September 2008 and ratified it on 5 July 2011.

Timeline of national policies and legislations supporting persons with disabilities in Pakistan:
 1981: The Disabled Persons’ (Employment and Rehabilitation) Ordinance
 2002: National Policy for Persons with Disabilities
 2006: National Plan of Action
 2006: Accessibility Code of Pakistan * 2008: Special Citizens’ Act 
 2008: National Youth Policy 
 2009: National Education Policy of Pakistan
 2010: Import of Duty-Free Car for Disabled Persons
 2011: Ratification of UNCRPD
 2014: Accessible Banking Infrastructure for Special Persons
 2014: Guidelines for Banking Services to Visually Impaired/Blind Persons
 2017: The Balochistan Persons with Disabilities Act
 2018: Sindh Empowerment of Persons with Disabilities Act
 2018: The ICT Rights of Persons with Disability Act
 2019: State Bank of Pakistan concessionary financing facility

Organizations

 Disabled Organisations Pakistan
 SAHARA Voluntary Social Welfare Agency for Persons with Disabilities, Dera Ismail Khan, KP
 NOWPDP
 Pakistan Association of the Deaf (PAD) 
 Pakistan Association of Blind (PAB)
 Family Education Services Foundation (FESF)
 ConnectHear
 JS Academy for Deaf
 Ida Rieu Welfare Association
 WonderTree
 Special Olympics Pakistan
 Tamir welfare organisation
 Electoral PWDS Rights Pakistan

Notable activists 
 Fatima Shah, activist for the blind and visually impaired.
 Hafiz Muhammad Iqbal, activist for the blind and visually impaired from Peshawar and MPhil scholar at University of Peshawar.
 Aamir Sohail Saddozai, Founder SAHARA Voluntary Agency for Persons with Disabilities and SAHARA Rehabilitation Center, Dera Ismail Khan 
 Ihsan Ullah Daudzai, activist for persons with disabilities.
 Farhat Rasheed, advocate for accessible and inclusive workplaces.
 Imran Ghanchi, advocate for hand-controlled auto rickshaws and mobility of persons with disabilities.
 Zahid Abdullah, person with a visual disability and member of Federal Information Commission recently set up by the Pakistani government.
 Yousaf Saleem, Pakistan's first blind judge.

Sport

Paralympics 

Pakistan have been competing at the Paralympic Games from 1992. So far, Pakistan has received 2 medals in Paralympics history in 2008 Summer Paralympics and in the 2016 Summer Paralympics.

Blind Cricket 
Pakistan national blind cricket team has participated in every editions of the Blind Cricket World Cup as well as in the Blind T20 World Cup tournaments. The Pakistan blind cricket team has won 2 Blind Cricket World Cup titles in 2002  and 2006.Hence became the first visually impaired cricket team to win 2 consecutive Blind Cricket World Cup titles.

The Pakistani blind cricket team also emerged as runners-up to South Africa in the inaugural edition of the Blind Cricket World Cup in 1998.

The Pakistan blind cricket team also emerged as runners-up to India in both Blind T20 World Cup tournaments.

Wheelchair Cricket 
Asia Cup T20 Tournament 2019 for Wheelchair users was played in Bangladesh in 2019. Pakistan, India, Bangladesh and Nepal participated in the tournament. Pakistan won the tournament after beating Indian Wheelchair Team by 5 wickets.

Special Olympics 
Special Olympics World Games 2019 were held in Abu Dhabi. Pakistan's contingent won a total of 61 medals including 18 gold medals, 28 silver medals and 15 bronze medals across 10 different sports.

Notable disabled sportspeople 

 Muhammad Akram, blind cricketer-Holds the record for registering the highest individual score in a Blind T20I innings
 Masood Jan, blind cricketer-Holds the record for registering the highest individual innings in a Blind One-Day International
 Haider Ali, Paralympic athlete-Only paralympic medallist for Pakistan in Paralympics history

References

External links

 Electoral Rights of PWDS in Pakistan